Qi Shun is a Paralympian athlete from China competing mainly in category T12 long-distance events.

He competed in the 2004 Summer Paralympics in Athens, Greece.  There he went out in the first round of the men's 1500 metres - T13 event, went out in the first round of the men's 5000 metres - T12 event, finished ninth in the men's 10000 metres - T13 event and did not finish in  the men's marathon - T13 event.  He also competed at the 2008 Summer Paralympics in Beijing, China.    There he won a gold medal in the men's marathon - T12 event.

External links
 

Paralympic athletes of China
Athletes (track and field) at the 2004 Summer Paralympics
Athletes (track and field) at the 2008 Summer Paralympics
Paralympic gold medalists for China
Year of birth missing (living people)
Living people
Chinese male marathon runners
Chinese male long-distance runners
Visually impaired marathon runners
Visually impaired long-distance runners
Paralympic marathon runners
Paralympic long-distance runners
Medalists at the 2008 Summer Paralympics
Paralympic medalists in athletics (track and field)
Medalists at the World Para Athletics Championships
Medalists at the 2010 Asian Para Games